Abdurehim is both a given name and a surname. Notable people with the name include:

Abdulla Abdurehim, Uyghur actor and singer
Dawut Abdurehim (born 1974), Chinese Uyghur refugee and Guantanamo Bay detainee
Abdurehim Heyit (born 1962), Uyghur folk singer‌ and compositor
Abdurehim Ötkür (1923–1995), Uyghur poet and writer